Lorenzo "Fat Cat" Nichols (born December 25, 1958) is an American convicted former drug kingpin who ran a sophisticated drug trafficking organization of the 80's in Jamaica, Queens. Members of Nichols's crew were a friend from prison, Howard "Pappy" Mason, a key part of Nichols's operation. Luc "Spoon" Stephen was another trusted associate as was Joseph "Mike Bones" Rogers. Nichols's headquarters was Big Mac's Deli, a business that he inherited from his then father-in-law.

He got his nickname "Fat Cat" because of his linebacker-thick neck, a head so big it nearly blocked out his friends' faces in snapshots, and his rangy beard," according to the book: "Queens Reigns Supreme: Fat Cat, 50 Cent, and the Rise of the Hip Hop Hustler" by Ethan Brown.

Sentencing and Punishment 
Nichols settled his case with the federal government, he pleaded guilty to ordering two deaths. One victim was a close friend from childhood and the other, was former girlfriend, Myrtle Horsham, 20 years old, the mother of Nichols's son. The tragedy ripped the Nichols's family apart. A heartbroken and outrage, Louise Coleman disowned her son for this horrific tragedy. reported: "Was one of the purposes of this to teach other people in the organization a lesson about not stealing from you?'' Judge Edward R. Korman of Federal District Court in Brooklyn asked Mr. Nichols." It wasn't just the stealing,'' Mr. Nichols replied. ''It was the fact that she was my girl and that she took my money and spent it on another person. She made me look bad in front of people who was within the organization.'' 

In 1992, Nichols pleaded guilty to Rooney’s murder, and received a sentence of 25 years to life. He also pleaded guilty to drug charges and racketeering charges, and was given an additional sentence of 40 years.

In 2010, the New York Daily News published a letter that Nichols had written the publication from his prison cell. "I have nothing but time to ponder my misdeeds," Nichols wrote, adding, "To the victims of my criminal activities, I offer my deepest regret and sincerest apology."

April 2022, Nichols was granted parole from state prison. He was released from Clinton Correctional Facility and transferred into federal custody.

References 

American drug traffickers
1958 births
Living people